Simpatico is an album by American jazz reedist Ken Vandermark, which was recorded in 1998 and released on Atavistic. It was the third recording of the Vandermark 5, the first with Dave Rempis replacing former saxophonist Mars Williams.

Reception

In his review for AllMusic, Thom Jurek states "Using American jazzmen for their spiritual inspiration and the European model of free jazz improv, Vandermark and company have come up with something entirely their own: a solid, gritty, soulful funk and squall band who holds within their collective grasp the souls of Sun Ra, Steve Lacy, Albert Ayler, and James Brown's JBs."

The Penguin Guide to Jazz notes that "Rempis is a surprise substitute for Williams, and since he plays only alto it slightly narrows the tonal palette - though this supercharges and superbly focuset set is surely the group's best to date."

Track listing
All compositions by Ken Vandermark
 "Vent" – 6:57
 "Fact and Fiction" – 8:48
 "Full Deck" – 5:17
 "Anywhere Else" – 9:54
 "STHLM" – 9:06
 "Cover to Cover" – 8:26
 "Point Blank" – 8:37
 "Encino" – 8:01

Personnel
Jeb Bishop – trombone, guitar
Kent Kessler – bass
Tim Mulvenna – drums
Dave Rempis – alto sax
Ken Vandermark – tenor sax, bass clarinet, Bb clarinet

References

1999 albums
Ken Vandermark albums
Atavistic Records albums